Ambrose Mlilo (born 22 December 1959) is a Zimbabwean boxer. He competed in the men's light middleweight event at the 1984 Summer Olympics.

References

External links
 

1959 births
Living people
Light-middleweight boxers
Zimbabwean male boxers
Olympic boxers of Zimbabwe
Boxers at the 1984 Summer Olympics
Commonwealth Games competitors for Zimbabwe
Boxers at the 1982 Commonwealth Games
Place of birth missing (living people)
African Boxing Union champions